The F Street Bridge in Salida, Colorado is a closed spandrel concrete arch bridge built in 1907 by the Pueblo Bridge Company. The design also known as a Luten Arch bridge was patented in 1907 by Daniel Luten. It is believed to be the first bridge of this type built by the company.

It spans the Arkansas River in a park setting.

See also
National Register of Historic Places listings in Chaffee County, Colorado

References

Luten bridges
Road bridges on the National Register of Historic Places in Colorado
Bridges completed in 1907
Transportation buildings and structures in Chaffee County, Colorado
National Register of Historic Places in Chaffee County, Colorado
Concrete bridges in the United States
Arch bridges in the United States